Caroline Patricia Lucas (born 9 December 1960) is a British politician who has twice led the Green Party of England and Wales and has been the Member of Parliament (MP) for Brighton Pavilion since the 2010 general election. She was re-elected in the 2015,  2017 and 2019 general elections, increasing her majority each time.

Born in Malvern in Worcestershire, Lucas graduated from the University of Exeter and the University of Kansas before receiving a PhD from the University of Exeter in 1989. She joined the Green Party in 1986 and held various party roles, also serving on Oxfordshire County Council from 1993 to 1997. She was elected as a Member of the European Parliament (MEP) for South East England in 1999 and re-elected in 2004 and 2009, also serving as the party's Female Principal Speaker from 2003 to 2006 and from 2007 to 2008.

Lucas was elected the first leader of the Green Party in 2008 and was selected to represent the constituency of Brighton Pavilion in the 2010 general election, becoming the party's first MP. She stood down as party leader in 2012 to devote more time to her parliamentary duties and focus on an ultimately successful campaign to be re-elected as an MP. She returned as party leader from September 2016 to September 2018, sharing the post with Jonathan Bartley.

Lucas is known as a campaigner and writer on green economics, localisation, alternatives to globalisation, trade justice, animal welfare and food. In her time as a politician and activist, she has worked with non-governmental organizations and think tanks, including the Royal Society for the Prevention of Cruelty to Animals, the Campaign for Nuclear Disarmament and Oxfam.

Early life and education
Lucas was born in Malvern in Worcestershire, to middle-class, Conservative-voting parents Peter and Valerie (née Griffin) Lucas. She is one of three children; her father ran a small central heating company, and sold solar panelling. Her mother stayed at home to bring up their children.

Lucas was educated at Malvern Girls' College (which became Malvern St James in 2006), a boarding private school in Great Malvern. She then went to the University of Exeter, where she gained a first-class BA (Hons) in English Literature, graduating in 1983. While at university, Lucas went on many trips to Greenham Common Women's Peace Camp and Molesworth peace camp when involved with the Campaign for Nuclear Disarmament (CND). Lucas was an activist in CND and was involved in the Snowball Campaign against US military bases in the UK which involved the cutting of fences with the expectation of being arrested.

Lucas won a scholarship to attend the University of Kansas between 1983 and 1984, gaining a Diploma of Journalism, before studying for a PhD degree in English from the University of Exeter, awarded in 1990, with a thesis entitled Writing for Women: a study of woman as reader in Elizabethan romance. While completing her doctorate, Lucas worked as a press officer for Oxfam from 1989; she later worked for the charity in other roles, becoming active in the Green Party, and left Oxfam in 1999.

Life and career

Early political career
After being "utterly inspired" by Jonathon Porritt's book Seeing Green, Lucas joined the Green Party in 1986. She noticed that the Green Party office was in Clapham, where she was living at the time, so thought: "Right! I'm going there now, I'm just going to dedicate the rest of my life to this party'." Soon afterwards she became the party's National Press Officer (1987–1989) and Co-Chair (1989–1990). In a 2009 Guardian interview, she told Decca Aitkenhead: "when I was putting people up to go on TV programmes I'd be saying to them, 'What are you planning to wear?', and they'd be slightly offended that I'd even think of asking the question. But I do genuinely think that has changed, a lot. It's a recognition, not that there's some kind of terrible compromise about putting on a tie, but that actually you don't want people to be focusing on what you look like but on what you're saying".

When the Green Party became three separate parties in 1990 for the constituent parts of the United Kingdom, she joined the Green Party of England and Wales. Lucas served as their General Election Speaker from 1991 (for the following year's general election) and a Regional Council Member from 1997.

Lucas's first success in an election came when she gained the Green Party's second council seat in the UK on Oxfordshire County Council, which she held between 1993 and 1997.

European Parliament
Lucas was first elected as a Member of the European Parliament for the South East England Region at the 1999 elections, the first year the election was by proportional representation. In that year the Green Party gained 7.4% of the vote (110,571 votes). In November 2001, she was convicted of a breach of the peace at the Faslane nuclear base in Scotland the previous February and fined £150 for her participation in a CND sit-down protest. Conducting her own defence at the trial, she pleaded not guilty. Lucas argued that she had a right under the Human Rights Act to peaceful protest following on from her firm anti-nuclear attitudes. Faslane is the base used for Britain's Trident nuclear programme. She was arrested for a protest at the same location in January 2007. "It still seems ironic that it is a non-violent demonstration that is judged to be a breach of the peace, rather than Britain's illegal and immoral possession of nuclear weapons", she wrote at the time.

Lucas was re-elected in 2004, gaining 173,351 votes (8% share), and again in the 2009 election when the party's vote under the list system rose to 271,506, or 11.6%. In the European Parliament, she was a member of the Committee for Trade, Industry, Energy and Research; the Committee on the Environment, Public Health and Consumer Policy; the Committee on International Trade; and the Temporary Committee on Climate Change.

Lucas was an early signatory of the International Simultaneous Policy (SIMPOL) which seeks to end the usual deadlock in tackling global issues. Lucas became a signatory in June 2004. In addition, she is or has been Vice-President of the Animal Welfare Intergroup, a member of Intergroups on Peace Issues and Consumer Affairs, a member of the Parliament's Delegation to ACP (African Caribbean, and Pacific) countries, and a member of the Delegation for Relations with the Palestinian Legislative Council. As part of her committee work, she was the Parliament's Rapporteur (draftsperson) on a Commission Communication on the impact of air transport on the environment, and the Vice-President of the parliament's committee of inquiry into foot-and-mouth disease.

In July 2008, Lucas joined the Green New Deal Group, an alliance of experts in finance, energy and the environment. The group put forward plans to invest in green energy, provide greater regulation of the finance sector, and strengthen ties between environmentalists, industry, agriculture, and trade unions. The proposals were put forth in response to fears over the recession, climate change, and increasing energy prices, and stressed the need for integrative policies towards tackling all three.

She held the party's post of Female Principal Speaker from 2003 to 2006 and from 2007 to 2008.

First period as leader (2008–2012)
Lucas was elected as the Green Party's first leader on 5 September 2008, gaining 92% of the vote (against one other candidate, Ashley Gunstock) on a turnout of 38%. Previously the party had operated under a collective leadership. The change "was about having a face the country recognises – or hopefully", she told Decca Aitkenhead in 2009, "comes to recognise. It was in recognition of the fact that people don't really relate to abstract ideas, they relate more to the people who embody them." Lucas was elected as the Green Party's first-ever MP (for Brighton Pavilion) at the general election of 2010.

In July 2010, Lucas expressed her support for seven campaigners of the Smash EDO campaign who had caused approximately £180,000 damage to an EDO MBM arms factory and were acquitted of conspiring to cause criminal damage. The jury accepted their defence of lawful excuse – action undertaken to prevent a much worse crime – because the company manufactured and sold certain components used by the Israeli military, notably in its assault on Gaza. Lucas stated that: "I am absolutely delighted the jury has recognised that the actions of the decommissioners were a legitimate response to the atrocities being committed in Gaza. I do not advocate non-violent direct action lightly ... [but] their actions were driven by the responsibility to prevent further suffering in Gaza."

In 2011, she voted against the military intervention in Libya.

On 14 May 2012, Lucas announced she would be standing down as leader as of September 2012 "in order to broaden opportunities for the range of talent in the party and to raise the profiles of others aspiring to election". She added: "I'm proud that during the four years of my term, we've moved Green politics forward to a higher level, with the party by far the most influential it has ever been."

Brighton Pavilion

Brighton Pavilion had the highest vote in the 2005 general election for a Green Party candidate when Keith Taylor, a former Green Party Principal Speaker, gained 22% of the vote. In 2007, Lucas declared her intention to stand for the Green Party's nomination for the prospective parliamentary candidate in the Brighton Pavilion constituency for the next general election. In a letter to party members, she indicated that she would only stand if she won the internal party selection election by more than 10%, to avoid internal division. She described the move as "the most difficult decision of my life", due to "personal and family commitments" but also her "loyalty and commitment to Keith Taylor, who is a person and a politician for whom I have great admiration and respect". On 18 July 2007, it was announced that Lucas had been selected by the Brighton Green Party. Lucas won with 55% of the party ballot against Keith Taylor's 45%.

In May 2010, Lucas was elected as the first Green MP to Westminster with a majority of 1,252. As well as being the first Green MP, Lucas was also the first woman to be elected as an MP for Brighton. She delivered her maiden speech on 27 May 2010.

Lucas opposed the presentation of bare-breasted models on page 3 in The Sun and in 2013 was reprimanded for transgressing the Westminster dress code by wearing a T-shirt with the logo "No More Page Three" to protest against the feature during a Commons debate.

On 19 August 2013, Lucas was arrested at a non-violent protest against Cuadrilla Resources fracking operations in Sussex. She was subsequently charged with obstructing a public highway but was found not guilty on 17 April 2014 at Brighton Magistrates' Court. After the hearing, Lucas said: "This judgement is right but this is not a victory or cause for celebration. We will continue to campaign to end fracking and only celebrate when our world is on the path to a clean energy future".

In the 2015 general election, Lucas was re-elected with a much increased majority of 7,967 and vote share. In the 2017 general election Lucas increased her majority to 14,689, elected on 52.3% of the vote. Her vote majority increased again in the 2019 election by 5% with 33,151 votes.

In accord with long-standing Green policy, Lucas voted in 2015 for holding the European Union Referendum, but campaigning to stay in the EU with major reform.

Co-leader with Jonathan Bartley
On 31 May 2016, it was announced that Lucas would run for the position of the Leader of the Green Party in a job share arrangement with the welfare spokesman Jonathan Bartley in the forthcoming 2016 Green Party leadership election.

On 2 September, it was announced that Lucas and Bartley had been elected with 86% of first-preference votes. Lucas said the party would strive to preserve the rights of EU nationals living in Britain, and EU rules on workers' rights and the environment, among other policies.

In May 2018, Lucas announced that at the end of her two-year term in September, she would not seek re-election as co-leader of the Green Party. In an article for The Guardian, Lucas wrote that "it's now time for me to show the power of letting go".

Other roles, writings and views
Lucas is vice-president of the Royal Society for the Prevention of Cruelty to Animals and has been on the National Council of the Campaign for Nuclear Disarmament since 2004. She is also Vice Chair of the All Party Parliamentary Group on Peak Oil and Gas. A former vice-president of the Stop the War Coalition, she resigned from the post in December 2015. According to a statement from Lucas's office, her "busy parliamentary and constituency schedule means that she doesn't have time to fully engage with the role of a patron and, in light of some recent StWC positions that she didn't support, she felt standing down was the responsible thing to do".

Lucas is a Vice-Chair of the All-Party Parliamentary Group for Choice at the End of Life and a member of the All-Party Parliamentary Group for Drug Policy Reform.

Lucas has served as an advisory board member to the International Forum on Globalisation, the Centre for a Social Europe, and the Protect the Local, Globally think-tank. She has been a Trustee of the Radiation Research Trust and Patron of the Joliba Trust (Africa). She is Matron of the Women's Environmental Network. Between 1997 and 1998, she was called upon as a Policy Adviser on Trade and Investment for the UK government's Department for International Development.

Lucas is a prolific writer of reports, articles and books on the subjects of trade justice, localisation, globalisation, animal welfare, and food, in which she is critical of free trade, a single European currency, trade-led development policies, genetically modified food, and a lack of attention to environmental and social issues. Her most substantial work is Green Alternatives to Globalisation: A Manifesto (co-authored with Mike Woodin), which advocates localisation of economies based on minimal trade and greater social and environmental concern, in opposition to neo-liberal, market-led forces of globalisation.

Lucas is an advocate for reform of UK drug laws. She has called for the law to have an evidence-based approach to drugs that treats drug abuse as a health matter, rather than a criminal one.

In early 2013, Lucas co-signed a letter that was published in The Guardian newspaper and officially marked her support for the People's Assembly Against Austerity movement. She also gave a speech at the People's Assembly Conference, held at Westminster Central Hall on 22 June 2013. A book by Lucas on her time in parliament, Honourable Friends: Parliament and the Fight for Change, was published in 2015.

In August 2015, Lucas endorsed Jeremy Corbyn's campaign in the Labour Party leadership election. She wrote in The Independent: "I've never felt so optimistic about a potential leader of the Labour Party. For the first time in my memory, the party of Keir Hardie and Clement Attlee looks likely to be led again by someone who dares to stand up for the radical changes demanded by the challenges we face."

Lucas is a supporter of a permanent universal basic income. In January 2016, Lucas tabled a motion in the British Parliament, calling on the Government to commission research into the effects of a universal basic income and examine its feasibility to replace the UK's existing social security system.

On 15 April 2018, she attended the launch event of the People's Vote, a campaign group calling for a public vote on the final Brexit deal between the UK and the European Union.

In August 2019 Lucas was subject to criticism for suggesting the creation of an all-female cabinet as part of a national unity government.

In February 2020 she was investigated by the Parliamentary Commissioner for Standards, following a complaint by Michael Fabricant that she had offered a tour of the Commons in exchange for £150, as part of a fundraising drive. Lucas said she did not believe she had done anything wrong. An investigation found she had breached the House of Commons Code of Conduct in offering and giving the tour. The Standards Commissioner also found that it gave her an "unfair advantage over other election candidates". Lucas acknowledged that she had breached the rules and promised not to repeat the breach; the Green Party returned the donation to the supporter who received the tour.

In 2021, Lucas was one of three MPs who successfully took legal action against the Department of Health and Social Care over contracts awarded during the COVID-19 pandemic.

In May 2021, alongside celebrities and other public figures, Lucas was a signatory to an open letter from Stylist magazine, which called on the government to address what it described as an "epidemic of male violence" by funding an "ongoing, high-profile, expert-informed awareness campaign on men's violence against women and girls".

Awards

In her time as a politician and activist, Lucas has won the 2006 Michael Kay Award "for her outstanding contribution to European animal welfare" from the RSPCA.

Lucas has won the award for Politician of the Year in The Observer Newspaper Ethical Awards three times. The award is voted for by Observer readers, who chose her to win in 2007, 2009 and 2010. In 2008 she was listed by The Guardian as one of "50 people who could save the planet".

In October 2008, Lucas was winner in the Trade category of The Parliament magazine MEP Awards 2008. The awards are voted for by MEPs and NGOs.  In April 2010 Lucas won Best UK Politician in The Independent Green Awards and in November 2010 she was awarded "Newcomer of the Year" in The Spectator Parliamentarian of the Year awards. In July 2011 she was awarded "Best all-rounder" in the Total Politics End of Year MP awards and in September 2011 she was awarded "MP of the Year" in the Women in Public Life Awards 2011.  Also in 2011 she was given the Political Studies Association award for "Influencing the Political Agenda" and voted "Progressive of the Year" in Left Foot Forward's readers' poll.

In November 2020 she was included in the BBC Radio 4 Woman's Hour Power list 2020.

Personal life
In 1991, Lucas married Richard Savage. The couple have two sons, one of whom is an academic at the University of California, Santa Barbara.

She is a vegetarian and told ITV news Political Correspondent Paul Brand that she is “moving as fast as she can towards being vegan” in September 2019.

Films 
In 2016 a short documentary film about Lucas, One Green Seat, directed by Daniel Ifans and produced by We Are Tilt, was an Official Selection at the 2017 Artemis Women In Action Film Festival in Santa Monica, California.

See also
 Anti-nuclear movement in the United Kingdom

References

Bibliography

 
 
 
 Lucas, C. P., Woodin, M., Green Alternatives to Globalisation: A Manifesto, 2004 
 Lucas, C. P., Global Warming, Local Warning: A study of the likely impacts of climate change upon South East England, 2004
 Lucas, C. P., Towards a GM free Europe: Halting the spread of GMOs in Europe, 2003
 Jones, A., Lucas, C. P., Local Food: Benefits and Opportunities, 2003
 Lucas, C. P., Time to Replace Globalisation, 2001
 Lucas, C. P., Which way for the European Union: Radical Reform or Business as Usual?, 2001
 Hines, C., Lucas, C. P., Stopping the Great Food Swap: Relocalising Europe's Food Supply, 2001
 Lucas, C. P., From Seattle to Nice: Challenging the Free Trade Agenda at the Heart of Enlargement, 2000
 Lucas, C. P., Woodin, M., The Euro or a Sustainable Future for Britain? A Green Critique of the Single Currency, 2000
 Lucas, C. P., Watchful in Seattle: World Trade Organisation threats to Public Services, Food and the Environment, 1999
 Lucas, C. P., Reforming World Trade: The Social and Environmental Priorities, 1996
 Coote, B., Lucas, C. P., The Trade Trap, 1994

External links

Official website

The NS interview: Caroline Lucas, Alyssa McDonald, New Statesman, 12 May 2010
Early Day Motions signed

|-

|-

1960 births
Caroline
20th-century women MEPs for England
21st-century British women politicians
21st-century women MEPs for England
Alumni of the University of Exeter
Articles containing video clips
British drug policy reform activists
Campaign for Nuclear Disarmament activists
English environmentalists
English feminists
English non-fiction writers
English republicans
English socialist feminists
English socialists
Female members of the Parliament of the United Kingdom for English constituencies
Green Party of England and Wales councillors
Green Party of England and Wales MEPs
Green Party of England and Wales MPs
Leaders of political parties in the United Kingdom
Living people
Members of Oxfordshire County Council
MEPs for England 1999–2004
MEPs for England 2004–2009
MEPs for England 2009–2014
People educated at Malvern St James
People from Malvern, Worcestershire
Politicians from Brighton and Hove
UK MPs 2010–2015
UK MPs 2015–2017
UK MPs 2017–2019
UK MPs 2019–present
Universal basic income in the United Kingdom
University of Kansas alumni
Women councillors in England